Oatlands College is a voluntary Christian Brothers  secondary school for boys aged 12–18, located in Mount Merrion, County Dublin in Ireland. It prepares students for Junior Certificate and Leaving Certificate examinations. The school was ranked as the first best voluntary secondary school in Ireland by the Irish Times newspaper in 2021.

Development
The Christian Brothers first established a community in 1951, before opening the school in 1955. It is now under the Trusteeship of the Edmund Rice Schools Trust. The school added a single storey extension in 1969 and later added a sports hall in 1980. After some modernisation in 1995, the school opened a new wing in 1999. In the summer of 2010, a new technology room, drawing room, music room, a second computer room, two new class rooms and two new science laboratories were added to the building. On 10 May 2012, a new sports hall with a canteen and a new classroom was opened by the President of Ireland Michael D. Higgins.
The school is served by Dublin Bus routes 7b, 7d, 46a, 46e, 47, 116, 118, 145 and 155 along the N11 Stillorgan Road Quality Bus Corridor. The school itself is located about two minutes walk to Stillorgan village.

Sports

Oatlands partakes in Badminton, soccer, basketball, chess, archery and athletics. The school has also a successful golf team who became the South Dublin champions in 2018, 2019 and 2020. In 2017, the senior badminton team won the South Dublin Cup. In 2018, the junior badminton won the South Dublin Cup with the seniors losing out to Benildus College.

Extra-curricular activities

School teams enter Business Quiz Competitions, Inter-School Debate Competitions, Student Enterprise Awards, the Young Scientist and Technology Exhibition, Young Social Innovators, Build a Bank, and Edmund Rice Awards. Students also participate in Schools Across Borders, and the Zambia Immersion Programme.

Each year a College Musical is performed by Transition Year students in association with the girls from Dominican College Sion Hill. "Talent Shows" are also held.

There is an annual School Tour in Transition Year to a continental destination (subject to sufficient uptake). Transition Year students may complete the ECDL Computer Course and Oatlands College is a recognised accrediting centre.

A school newsletter `Oatlands News` is currently published twice a year.

Members
 Niall Williams author and Man Booker Prize nominee 2014
 Brian Brennan, author and journalist
 Paddy Carr, GAA manager
 Kenny Carroll, Irish cricketer
 Michael Carwood, Irish press journalist
 Don Conroy, artist and RTÉ Television presenter
 Paul Griffin, Gaelic footballer
 Dermot Moran, philosophy professor
 Dermot Morgan, comedian, star as Father Ted
 Paddy Kavanagh, footballer
 Ross O'Carroll, hurler
 Éamon Ó Cuív TD, Fianna Fáil party politician and former cabinet minister
 Stephen Collins, political editor of the Irish Times

References

Secondary schools in Dún Laoghaire–Rathdown